Lieutenant-Colonel Henry Caldwell (c. 1735 – 1810) was a Canadian army and militia officer, a successful businessman and a member of the Legislative Council of Lower Canada.

Early life
The youngest son of Sir John Caldwell (d. 1744) 3rd Bt., of Castle Caldwell & Wellsborough, High Sheriff of Fermanagh; by his wife Anne (d. 1769), daughter of the Very Rev. John Trench (d. 1725) of Moate, Co. Galway; Dean of Raphoe.

Capture of Louisbourg
Henry Caldwell fought with distinction at the capture of Louisbourg, Cape Breton, afterward promoted to captain by James Wolfe (who included him in his will) and assistant quartermaster to General Guy Carleton, 1st Baron Dorchester during the Siege of Quebec.

Post-military career
Caldwell retired from the British army with the rank of major in 1774, remaining in Quebec. He leased land that had belonged to Governor George Murray (British Army officer) and built Caldwell Manor. The following year he served as a Lieutenant-Colonel with the militia during the defence of Sainte-Foy and was chosen to carry the dispatches reporting the victory to London. His military service earned him the King's praise, financial reward and a seat in the Canadian parliament. In 1787 he was promoted to colonel of the Quebec Battalion of British Militia, a rank he held until June 1794. Described as 'a handsome soldier', Caldwell was supposed to be the inspiration for the character Colonel Ed Rivers in the novel The History of Emily Montague, by Frances Brooke.

Caldwell was a founder of the Agriculture Society (1791), serving as its chairman, to improve the breeding of livestock and the production of hemp in Quebec. In 1801 he purchased all the property that had belonged to Governor Murray, establishing himself as an important landowner, and he bought further considerable tracts of land throughout Quebec. From the mills he built he supplied the troops stationed in North America and bought boats, wharves and warehouses to produce, store and export his goods. In 1810 alone he sold more than 1,775,000 pounds of flour to the government for just under £22,000.

In 1804, as a result of the Napoleon's European blockade, Caldwell persuaded Henry Dundas, 1st Viscount Melville, the Lord of the Admiralty, to instead develop Canadian timber for the Royal Navy. His sawmills became the best known in Quebec and the Etchemin mills at the mouth of the Etchemin River were among the largest.

As a politician he was "a man of rather tempestuous nature and strong personality (and) he naturally found himself in conflict with the governors of the time." In 1784 he was appointed deputy receiver general. Under Governor Carleton he focused on improving the militia, highways, communications and later education. Ten years later, in 1794, he was sworn in as Receiver-General of Lower Canada with an annual salary of £400. He retained this position until 1808 when his son, John Caldwell, took over. Long after his death, in 1823, it was discovered that he had embezzled nearly £40,000 during the exercise of his duties, including almost £8,000 from the Jesuit estates, which he had managed as treasurer of the commission set up to administer them.

Death
Henry Caldwell died May 28, 1810 at his home, Belmont, near Quebec. His wife, Ann, died six years earlier. She was a daughter of Alexander Hamilton (d.1808) M.P., K.C., of Hampton Hall, Co. Dublin & Newtonhamilton, Co. Armagh. Her father represented Belfast in Parliament. Ann was the great aunt of Chief Justice Edward Bowen who came to Quebec with the Caldwells. Henry left all his personal goods and property to his only son, except for the seigneury of Lauson, which he bequeathed to his grandson Henry John Caldwell, and what was left of Sans Bruit, which went to his granddaughter Ann Caldwell; he also left various gifts to relatives and friends.

External links
 
 

1735 births
1774 deaths
Members of the Legislative Council of Lower Canada
36th Regiment of Foot officers
Anglophone Quebec people